Charles Meredith (29 May 1811 – 2 March 1880) was an Australian grazier and politician. He served as Tasmanian Colonial Treasurer for several years in the mid-to-late 19th century.

Early life
Meredith was born on 29 May 1811 at Poyston Lodge, Pembroke, Wales, the youngest son of George Meredith and his wife, Sarah Westall Hicks. He was descended in a direct line from the last kings of Wales. His father saw service in the royal marines during the Napoleonic wars, and later decided to emigrate to Van Diemen's Land (later called Tasmania). He arrived at Hobart with his father, wife and family on 18 March 1821 and became one of the best known of the early pioneers. Charles assisted his father in farming in Tasmania for some time.

In 1834, Meredith went to New South Wales and took up land on the Murrumbidgee River after being denied a grant of land by Lieutenant-Governor George Arthur. He visited England in 1838 and married his cousin, Louisa Anne Twamley at Old Edgbaston Church, Birmingham on 18 April 1839. They sailed for Sydney in the Letitia and arrived in September. While Charles inspected sheep stations on the Murrumbidgee River, Louisa stayed at Bathurst. After a few weeks in Sydney, they moved to suburban Homebush. Meredith then returned to Tasmania. In 1843, he was appointed a police magistrate at Port Sorell in the north-west.

Political career
Meredith became a member of the original Tasmanian Legislative Council and was elected for Glamorgan in the first house of assembly in 1856. He was colonial treasurer in the Thomas Gregson ministry for two months in 1857, and held the same position in the James Whyte ministry from January 1863 to November 1866. He was opposition leader 1862–63 and November 1866–72. He held the lands and works portfolios in the Frederick Innes cabinet from November 1872 to August 1873, and was again colonial treasurer in the Thomas Reibey ministry from July 1876 to August 1877. In total, he was in parliament almost 24 years and was a member of the executive council for 17 years.

Late life and legacy
Meredith resigned his seat on account of ill-health in 1879, and died at Launceston, Tasmania, on 2 March 1880. His wife and children survived him.

Meredith was one of the few Tasmanians whose name has been publicly commemorated; a mountain range in north-east Tasmania is named for him and a fountain in his memory was erected in the Queen's domain, Hobart, in 1885.

References
 

1811 births
1880 deaths
Members of the Tasmanian House of Assembly
Members of the Tasmanian Legislative Council
Leaders of the Opposition in Tasmania
Treasurers of Tasmania
Welsh emigrants to colonial Australia
19th-century Australian politicians